Samuel Doyle Riddle (July 1, 1861 – January 8, 1951) was an American businessman and racehorse owner. He was born in Glen Riddle, Pennsylvania, a small town southwest of Philadelphia given the family name by his father.

Samuel D. Riddle, a native of Delaware County, owned and operated a woolen mill started by his father, Samuel Riddle, but is best known as a sportsman. His father Samuel Riddle was born in Ireland and arrived in America in 1825. His mother was Lydia Doyle.  He had a brother, Leander W. Riddle. His sisters were Lydia Maud Riddle (who married Donald C. Haldeman, general manager for Great Britain and Ireland of the Mutual Life Insurance Company of New York) and Charlotte Buffington Riddle. Miss Riddle, member number 25516 of the Daughters of the American Revolution, married Mr. Homer Lee (of Mansfield, Ohio, who founded the Homer Lee Bank Note Company in New York City). Their children were Leander Lee and Homer Lee, Jr. 

Riddle married Elizabeth "Lizzie" Dobson in 1883.  She was the daughter of John Dobson, who with his brother owned a mill in East Falls, Philadelphia.  Riddle and Elizabeth had no children, but raised Elizabeth's niece, Sarah Dobson Fiske, the daughter of Elizabeth's sister, Sarah Dobson Fiske.

Thoroughbred racing
The owner of Glen Riddle Farm, Riddle bred and raced Thoroughbred race horses. His most famous horses were Man o' War and U.S. Triple Crown winner, War Admiral.

In partnership with Walter M. Jeffords, Sr., the husband of niece Sarah, Samuel D. Riddle purchased and operated Faraway Farm on Huffman Mill Pike near Lexington Kentucky where they stood Man o' War. In 1939, Riddle turned down an offer of a then unheard of $1 million for Man o' War.

Upon his death in January 1951, Mr. Riddle's will stipulated that his estate was to be used to provide a hospital for the community of Media, Pennsylvania, the nearest town to Glen Riddle.

The Riddlewood residential housing development in Middletown Township, Delaware County, Pennsylvania, is named for Mr. Riddle and its streets are named for the horses he owned.

References

1861 births
1951 deaths
American racehorse owners and breeders
Breeders of U.S. Thoroughbred Triple Crown winners
Owners of U.S. Thoroughbred Triple Crown winners
People from Delaware County, Pennsylvania